Dairon Estibens Asprilla Rivas (born May 25, 1992) is a Colombian professional footballer who currently plays as a winger for Portland Timbers in Major League Soccer.

Asprilla debuted for Alianza Petrolera in his native Colombia when he was 20 years old. For 2015, he was the second top goalscorer of the club with 22 goals. After several years playing in Colombia, Asprilla signed with MLS club Portland Timbers on December 8, 2014.

Honours
Portland Timbers
MLS Cup: 2015
Western Conference (playoffs): 2015

References

External links

1992 births
Living people
Colombian footballers
Colombian expatriate footballers
Alianza Petrolera players
Portland Timbers players
Portland Timbers 2 players
Expatriate soccer players in the United States
Major League Soccer players
USL Championship players
Colombian expatriate sportspeople in the United States
Sportspeople from Chocó Department
Association football wingers
Association football forwards